La Casera–Peña Bahamontes was a Spanish professional cycling team that existed from 1968 to 1974. Pedro Torres won the mountains classification in the 1973 Tour de France with the team.

References

External links

Cycling teams based in Spain
Defunct cycling teams based in Spain
1968 establishments in Spain
1974 disestablishments in Spain
Cycling teams established in 1968
Cycling teams disestablished in 1974